Postojna is a town in the traditional region  of Inner Carniola,  from Trieste, in southwestern Slovenia. It is the seat of the Municipality of Postojna.

History
The area is known to have been populated since the paleolithic era due to the discovery of a cave settlement near the town of Postojna called Betal Rock Shelter. The town lies on the Pivka River. Written sources first mention the settlement in the 13th century and in 1432 it became a borough. It was proclaimed a town in 1909. 

From the late Middle Ages, it was part of the Duchy of Carniola and hence of the Habsburg monarchy. It was under Italian rule between 1918 and 1943 (nominally to 1947) and was part of the province of Trieste as Postumia.

Mass grave
At Postojna there is a mass grave associated with the Second World War. The Pine Shaft Mass Grave is southeast of Postojna, between Little Trebevnik Hill and Big Trebevnik Hill. It is a steep sinkhole that contains the remains of unidentified victims.

Climate

Attractions
One of Slovenia's major tourist attractions, Postojna Cave, is located near the town.

Church
The parish church in the town is dedicated to Saint Stephen and belongs to the Koper Diocese. Within the urban area of Postojna, the church dedicated to the Prophet Daniel in the hamlet of Zalog and the chapel dedicated to Saint Lazarus at the town cemetery also belong to this parish.

See also
Postojna Cave
Planina Cave
Predjama Castle
Haasberg Castle

References

External links

 Postojna on Geopedia

 
Populated places in the Municipality of Postojna
Cities and towns in Inner Carniola